British military mission to Greece may refer to:

 British naval mission to Greece (1911–1915); see First Balkan War
 British naval mission to Greece (1919–1921); under Commodore Howard Kelly
 British military mission to Greece (1942–1944), sent during the Greek Resistance in World War II; see Military history of Greece during World War II
 British military mission to Greece (1945–1952), sent during the Greek Civil War

See also
 French military mission to Greece (disambiguation)